David Chiu may refer to:

David Chiu (poker player), professional poker player based in California, United States
David Chiu (politician), San Francisco politician and representative for California's 17th State Assembly district
David Jung-Kuang Chiu, dean of Hofstra University in Hempstead, New York, United States until 2001

See also
David Chu (disambiguation)